Charles Lathrop Pack (May 7, 1857 – June 14, 1937), a third-generation timberman, was "one of the five wealthiest men in America prior to World War I". He owed his good start in life to the success of his father, George Willis Pack, and grandfather, George Pack, Jr. in the forestry sector. Growing up on Lake Huron in Michigan's Lower Peninsula, Charles L. Pack lived in Cleveland, Ohio, from 1871 to the early years of the 20th century. With "savvy investments ... in southern timber ... banking and real estate", Pack became a multi-millionaire. During World War I, he was a principal organizer and was heavily involved in the war garden movement in the United States.

Victory Gardens
In March 1917, Charles Lathrop Pack organized the US National War Garden Commission and launched the war garden campaign.  After the war, he documented the victory garden movement in The War Garden Victorious.

Philatelist

Pack was a world-famous philatelist, recognized for his award-winning collections of postage stamps.

Collecting interests
Pack was noted for his collections of postage stamps of New South Wales, New Zealand, Canada, Cape of Good Hope, Spain, Argentina, Uruguay and Brazil.  He was especially noted for his plating of early stamps of Brazil and the plating of the Uruguay 1856 'Diligencia' issue.

Philatelic literature
Pack’s collection of postage stamps of Victoria led to his publication in 1923 of his famous book Victoria: the Half-length Portraits and the Twopence Queen Enthroned.

Honors and awards
Pack received worldwide recognition and numerous awards. He signed the Roll of Distinguished Philatelists in 1921. He was the first American to receive the Crawford Medal in 1923 from the Royal Philatelic Society London. He was also the first American to receive the Lindenberg Medal in 1926 from the Berliner Philatelisten-Klub and the first person to receive the Award of Merit from the Collectors Club of New York. Pack is named in the American Philatelic Society Hall of Fame for 1941.

Philanthropy
According to his biographer, Alexandra Eyle, Charles Lathrop Pack "spent $2.8 million on forestry conservation. This is a low figure, however..."

End of life
Pack's remains were buried in 1937 "under a stand of white pine in the Charles Lathrop Pack Demonstration Forest in Warrensburg, New York... a site of his own choosing".

Publications 
 
 Pack, Charles Lathrop. 1922. "The School Book of Forestry".
 Pack, Charles Lathrop. 1923. Victoria: the Half-length Portraits and the Twopence Queen Enthroned

See also
 Euclid Avenue (Cleveland, Ohio)
 Victory garden
 Philately
 Philatelic literature
 Wellington R. Burt

References

Notes

Bibliography
 Eyle, Alexandra. (1992). Charles Lathrop Pack: Timberman, Forest Conservationist, and Pioneer in Forest Education. Syracuse, NY: ESF College Foundation, Inc., and College of Environmental Science and Forestry. Distributed by Syracuse University Press. Available:   Internet Archive

External links
 
 
 

1857 births
1937 deaths
Businesspeople in timber
History of forestry in the United States
History of forestry education
Businesspeople from Cleveland
Philanthropists from New York (state)
Philatelic literature
American philatelists
Recipients of the Lindenberg Medal
State University of New York College of Environmental Science and Forestry people
People from Huron County, Michigan
People from Lexington, Michigan
Signatories to the Roll of Distinguished Philatelists
American Philatelic Society